Hossein Tayyebi Bidgoli (born 29 September 1988) is an Iranian professional futsal player who plays for Palma and the Iran national futsal team. His first match with Iran was in 2009 at the age of 20. He was ranked Top Goalscorer at the 2014 (15) and 2018 AFC Futsal Championship (14), and 5th Best Player in the World at the UMBRO Futsal Awards in 2017 and 2018.

Honours

International 
 FIFA Futsal World Cup
 Third place (1): 2016
 AFC Futsal Championship
 Champion (2): 2016, 2018
 Runner-up (2): 2014, 2022
 Third place (1): 2012
 Asian Indoor and Martial Arts Games
 Champion (2): 2013, 2017
 Grand Prix
 Runner-Up (2): 2009, 2015
 Third place (2): 2013, 2014
 WAFF Futsal Championship
 Champion (1): 2012

Club 
 AFC Futsal Club Championship
 Champion (1): 2018 (Mes Sungun)
 Runner-Up (1): 2013 (Giti Pasand)
 Third place (1): 2017 (Thái Sơn Nam)
 UEFA Futsal Champions League
 Runner-up (1): 2018–19 (Kairat Almaty)
 Third place (1): 2016–17 (Kairat Almaty)
 Iranian Futsal Super League
 Champion (2): 2009–10 (Foolad Mahan), 2012–13 (Giti Pasand)
 Runner-up (1): 2015–16 (Mes Sungun)
 Kazakhstani Futsal Championship
 Champion (3): 2016–17 (Kairat Almaty), 2017–18 (Kairat Almaty), 2018–19 (Kairat Almaty)
 Kazakhstan Cup
 Champion (2): 2016 (Kairat Almaty), 2017 (Kairat Almaty)
 Kazakhstan Super Cup
 Champion (1): 2017 (Kairat Almaty)
 Eremenko Cup
 Champion (2): 2017 (Kairat Almaty), 2018 (Kairat Almaty)

Individual 
 Best new young player
 Best new young futsal player of the 2009–10 Iranian Futsal Super League
 Best player
 Best futsal player of the Futsal at the 2013 Asian Indoor and Martial Arts Games
 Best futsal player of the 2015–16 Iranian Futsal Super League
 Top Goalscorer
 Futsal at the 2013 Asian Indoor and Martial Arts Games
 AFC Futsal Asian Cup: 2014 (15), 2018 (14)
 Grand Prix de Futsal: 2014 (9)
 Kazakhstan League & Cup: 2017 (Kairat Almaty) (11)
 Eremenko Cup: 2017, 2018
 Runner-up Top Goalscorer
 AFC Futsal Asian Cup: 2016
 UMBRO Futsal Awards
 5th Best Player in the World: 2017, 2018
 AFC Annual Awards
 Nominated (among 3) for Futsal Player of the Year: 2013, 2014

References

External links 
 
 
 http://www.ffiri.ir/en/national-football-team/Futsal-National-Team/NationalTeamAdultFootsal/results/

1988 births
Living people
Sportspeople from Mashhad
People from Mashhad
Iranian men's futsal players
Futsal forwards
Elmo Adab FSC players
Foolad Mahan FSC players
Giti Pasand FSC players
Mes Sungun FSC players
Tasisat Daryaei FSC players
S.L. Benfica futsal players
Iranian expatriate futsal players
Iranian expatriate sportspeople in Russia
Iranian expatriate sportspeople in Kazakhstan
Iranian expatriate sportspeople in Vietnam
Iranian expatriate sportspeople in Portugal
Iranian expatriate sportspeople in Spain